Graham Christian Mink (born May 21, 1979) is an American former professional ice hockey winger.

Playing career
Undrafted, Mink originally played high school hockey with Stowe High School, winning the Division III state championship in his sophomore year and Division II state championship in his senior year. After high school, he attended Northfield Mount Hermon school for a post graduate year. He then was a recruited walk on to play collegiate hockey with the University of Vermont in the ECAC. After an unimpressive freshman year, Mink gradually improved within the Catamounts and in his junior year placed second on the team in scoring with 17 goals and 29 points in 32 games. Just prior to his senior year in 2001–02, Mink left Vermont and turned pro, signing with the Portland Pirates on September 25, 2001.

In his first professional season, Mink made his debut in the ECHL, appearing in 29 games with the Richmond Renegades before moving up to the Pirates. Following an impressive 34 points in 56 games, Mink was signed by their NHL affiliate, the Washington Capitals for the 2002–03 season and continued to play for the Pirates and later on the Hershey Bears, helping them as an assistant captain to the 2006 and 2009 Calder Cups.

On July 8, 2009, Graham signed a two-year free agent deal with the Florida Panthers. He was then assigned to AHL affiliate, the Rochester Americans where he served as an alternate captain for the 2009–10 season.

On August 3, 2010, Mink was traded by the Panthers to the St. Louis Blues in exchange for T.J. Fast.

On July 13, 2011, Mink left the Peoria Rivermen and signed a one-year American Hockey League contract to return to the Hershey Bears for the 2011–12 AHL season.

After 12 seasons of professional hockey in predominantly the AHL, Mink was signed to his first European contract, agreeing to a one-year deal with Dornbirner EC of the Austrian Hockey League on August 10, 2013. Mink played one season with Dornbirner, totaling 23 goals and 23 assists in 51 games before retiring from hockey.

Personal
Mink is married and has two children. He also has his insurance and real estate license in his home state of Vermont.

Career statistics

References

External links

1979 births
Living people
American men's ice hockey right wingers
Dornbirn Bulldogs players
Hershey Bears players
Ice hockey people from Vermont
People from Stowe, Vermont
Peoria Rivermen (AHL) players
Portland Pirates players
Providence Bruins players
Rochester Americans players
Undrafted National Hockey League players
Vermont Catamounts men's ice hockey players
Washington Capitals players
Worcester Sharks players